John Bull's Adventures in the Fiscal Wonderland  is a novel by Charles Geake and Francis Carruthers Gould, written in 1904 and published by Methuen & Co. of London. It is a political parody of Lewis Carroll's two books, Alice's Adventures in Wonderland (1865) and Through the Looking-Glass (1871).

The book features 48 drawings by Gould, after the originals by John Tenniel.

It is critical of the economic politics of the day, which John Bull tries to make sense of. A number of notable British politicians are identified in the book. Joseph Chamberlain is the Prefferwense, the Mad Hatter, the Cheshire Cat, and the Knave of Hearts; Arthur Balfour is the March Hare and Humpy Dumpy; the Earl of Rosebery is Tweedle-R., Henry Campbell-Bannerman is Twee-C.-B., Jesse Collings is the White Rabbit, and the Duke of Devonshire is the Dormouse.

Editions
1904 original edition available at the Internet Archive
1904 edition in html format
2010 modern edition Evertype

Notes

1904 British novels
1904 fantasy novels
Books based on Alice in Wonderland
British fantasy novels
Methuen Publishing books
Henry Campbell-Bannerman